The United States District Court for the Western District of Missouri (in case citations, W.D. Mo.) is the federal judicial district encompassing 66 counties in the western half of the State of Missouri. The Court is based in the Charles Evans Whittaker Courthouse in Kansas City.

 the United States Attorney is Teresa A. Moore.

History

Missouri was admitted as a state on August 10, 1821, and the United States Congress established the United States District Court for the District of Missouri on March 16, 1822. The District was assigned to the Eighth Circuit on March 3, 1837. Congress subdivided it into Eastern and Western Districts on March 3, 1857. and has since made only small adjustments to the boundaries of that subdivision. The division was prompted by a substantial increase in the number of admiralty cases arising from traffic on the Mississippi River, which had followed an act of Congress passed in 1845 and upheld by the United States Supreme Court in 1851, extending federal admiralty jurisdiction to inland waterways. These disputes involved "contracts of affreightment, collisions, mariners' wages, and other causes of admiralty jurisdiction", and litigants of matters arising in St. Louis found it inconvenient to travel to Jefferson City for their cases to be tried.

When the District of Missouri was subdivided, Robert William Wells was the sole judge serving the District of Missouri. Wells was then reassigned to serve only the Western District.

Jurisdiction 
The district is divided into five divisions: Western (Kansas City), Central (Jefferson City), Southern (Springfield), Southwestern (Joplin), and St. Joseph (St. Joseph). There are divisional clerk's Offices in Jefferson City and Springfield in addition to the primary office in Kansas City. New cases and pleadings in the District Court may be filed in the clerk's offices in Kansas City, Jefferson City, and Springfield; Bankruptcy Court filings, however, only are accepted in the Kansas City clerk's office. The United States Court of Appeals for the Eighth Circuit across Missouri in St. Louis has jurisdiction over decisions appealed from the Western District of Missouri (except for patent claims and claims against the U.S. government under the Tucker Act, which are appealed to the Federal Circuit).

The five court divisions each cover the following counties:

The Western Division covers Bates, Carroll, Cass, Clay, Henry, Jackson, Johnson, Lafayette, Ray, St. Clair, and Saline counties.

The Central Division covers Benton, Boone, Callaway, Camden, Cole, Cooper, Hickory, Howard, Miller, Moniteau, Morgan, Osage, and Pettis counties.

The Southern Division covers Cedar, Christian, Dade, Dallas, Douglas, Greene, Howell, Laclede, Oregon, Ozark, Polk, Pulaski, Taney, Texas, Webster, and Wright counties.

The St. Joseph Division covers Andrew, Atchison, Buchanan, Caldwell, Clinton, Daviess, DeKalb, Gentry, Grundy, Harrison, Holt, Livingston, Mercer, Nodaway, Platte, Putnam, Sullivan, and Worth counties.

The Southwestern Division covers Barry, Barton, Jasper, Lawrence, McDonald, Newton, Stone, and Vernon counties.

Current judges 
:

Vacancies and pending nominations

Former judges

Chief judges

Succession of seats

United States Attorneys 
Recent, former U.S. attorneys for the district

 Mary Elizabeth Phillips
 Todd Graves
 Bradley Schlozman
 Tammy Dickinson
 Timothy A. Garrison (incumbent)

See also
 Courts of Missouri
 List of current United States district judges
 List of United States federal courthouses in Missouri

References

External links
 

Missouri, West
Missouri law
Government of Kansas City, Missouri
Jefferson City, Missouri
Government of Springfield, Missouri
Joplin, Missouri
St. Joseph, Missouri
Courthouses in Missouri
1857 establishments in Missouri
Courts and tribunals established in 1857